Julian Michael Johnson FBA (born 1 July 1963) is a music scholar, specialising in music history and the aesthetics of modern music. Since 2013, he has been Regius Professor of Music at Royal Holloway, University of London. After completing his undergraduate degree at Pembroke College, Cambridge, Johnson studied for his master's degree at the University of Sussex, which also awarded him his doctorate in 1994. He then lectured at Sussex until 2001, when he became a reader in the University of Oxford's Faculty of Music, and a fellow of St Anne's College, Oxford. In 2007, he joined Royal Holloway as Professor of Music.

Honours 
In July 2017, Johnson was elected a Fellow of the British Academy (FBA), the United Kingdom's national academy for the humanities and social sciences.

Selected works 

 
 Webern and the Transformation of Nature (Cambridge: Cambridge University Press, 1999).
 Who Needs Classical Music? Cultural Choice and Musical Value (New York: Oxford University Press, 2002).
 Mahler's Voices: Expression and Irony in the Songs and Symphonies (Oxford: Oxford University Press, 2009).
 Out of Time: Music and the Making of Modernity (New York: Oxford University Press, 2015).
 (Edited with Guldbrandsen) Transformations of Musical Modernism, Music in the Twentieth Century series (Cambridge: Cambridge University Press, 2015).

References   

1963 births
Living people
Alumni of Pembroke College, Cambridge
Alumni of the University of Sussex
Academics of the University of Sussex
Fellows of St Anne's College, Oxford
Academics of Royal Holloway, University of London
Fellows of the British Academy